Sergey Novikov may refer to:
Sergei Novikov (footballer) (born 1961), Soviet Russian footballer
Sergei Novikov (mathematician) (born 1938), Russian mathematician
Sergey Novikov (biathlete) (born 1979), Belarusian biathlete
Sergey Novikov (cross-country skier) (born 1980), Russian cross-country skier
Sergey Novikov (photographer), Russian photographer

See also
Serhiy Novikov (1949–2021), Soviet judoka from Ukraine
Siarhei Novikau (disambiguation)